Oliver Michael Dittrich (born 20 November 1956) is a German television personality, comedian, actor, and musician.

Life 
Dittrich completed a three year-education as a theatre painter in the Hamburg State Opera (1975–1978). At the same time, he started his professional career as a musician, composer, and songwriter. 

Dittrich became famous in Germany for his work as an actor and comedian in the comedy television show RTL Samstag Nacht. He appeared in films and TV series but has also performed live on stage. He sang and played in the band Die Doofen with Wigald Boning, which sold over 1,5 mio copies with only two albums. In 1995, the duo started playing as one of the supporting acts with Jon Bon Jovi on his stadium tour through Germany. As a musician, Dittrich plays in the band Texas Lightning, who also had a No. 1 hit ("No No Never") and Top 5 album. The band represented Germany at the Eurovision Song Contest in 2006. 

After working on the programme RTL Samstag Nacht for five years, Dittrich appeared in many television programmes, shows or films, such as Blind Date, Frühstücksfernsehen, and Dittsche. Currently, Dittrich is regarded in Germany as being one of the most versatile actors, specialized in creating fictional characters.

Works

Films 
 1997: Der Neffe (TV film)
 1998: Quest for Camelot (Animation film), German Voice of "Devon"
 1999: , as Bart
 1999: , as Wollner
 2004: Stauffenberg (TV film), as Goebbels
 2004: Der Wixxer, as Dieter Dubinski
 2006: 7 Zwerge – Der Wald ist nicht genug, as Pinocchio
 2009: Same Same But Different, as Ben's father
 2010: Ottos Eleven, as Harry Hirsch
 2011:  (TV film), as Gottlieb Daimler
 2011: 
 2013: , as Thomas Müller
 2013:

Television 
 1991: Bonings Bonbons
 1993-1998: RTL Samstag Nacht (148 Shows)
 2000–2001: Olli, Tiere, Sensationen (TV series, 16 Shows)
 2001–2007: Blind Date (Impro-Series with Anke Engelke, 6 episodes)
 2003–2011: Genial Daneben (Guest)
 since 2004: Dittsche (over 200 episodes, still running), as Dittsche
 2006: Was tun, Herr Beckenbauer? (Harald Schmidt Spezial, TV-Special), as Franz Beckenbauer
 2009: Pastewka (TV series), Special guest
 2010:  (TV series), episode: , as Herrenausstatter
 2013: Frühstücksfernsehen (TV-Persiflage Part 1, with Cordula Stratmann)
 2014: Das TalkGespräch (TV-Persiflage Part 2, with Cordula Stratmann)
 2015: Schorsch Aigner – Der Mann, der Franz Beckenbauer war (TV-Persiflage Part 3)
 2015: Das FIFA-Märchen – Fragen an Schorsch Aigner (TV-Persiflage Part 4)
 2015:  (TV miniseries, 3 episodes), as Dietmar
 2016: Der Sandro-Report: Zahlemann live (TV-Persiflage Part 5)
 2016: Selbstgespräche mit Konstantin Pfau (TV-Persiflage Part 6)
 2017: Der Meisterreporter – Sigmar Seelenbrecht wird 81 (TV-Persiflage Part 7)
 2017: Trixie Wonderland – Weihnachten mit Trixie Dörfel
 2018: Trixie Nightmare – Der tiefe Fall der Trixie Dörfel
 2019: FRUST – das Magazin

Music 
 Die Doofen
 Texas Lightning

Awards

Television 
 1994: Bayerischer Fernsehpreis for RTL Samstag Nacht
 1994: Bambi for RTL-Samstag Nacht
 1995: Bambi for Die Doofen
 1995: Adolf-Grimme-Preis"Spezial" for "Zwei Stühle – Eine Meinung" (RTL Samstag Nacht)
 1995: Goldene Europa for "Die Doofen“
 1995: Goldene Romy (Austria) for "RTL-Samstag Nacht“
 2003: Bayerischer Fernsehpreis for "Blind Date" (ZDF)
 2003: Adolf-Grimme-Preis with Gold for "Blind Date" (ZDF)
 2004: Deutscher Fernsehpreis for "Dittsche – das wirklich wahre Leben" (WDR)
 2005: Adolf-Grimme-Preis with Gold for "Dittsche – das wirklich wahre Leben" (WDR)
 2007: DVD-Award for "Dittsche – das wirklich wahre Leben“
 2008: Radio Regenbogen-Award – "Beste Comedy “
 2009: Goldene Kamera – "Best Entertainment“
 2010: Göttinger Elch – Lifework
 2011: "Bremen 4 - Comedy-Preis / Ehrenpreis
 2013: "Das grosse Kleinkunstfestival der Wühlmaeuse" - Ehrenpreis
 2015: Tegtmeiers Erben – Ehrenpreis
 2016: Adolf-Grimme-Preis for "Schorsch Aigner - der Mann, der Franz Beckenbauer war"
 2016: Bayerischer Fernsehpreis for "Schorsch Aigner - der Mann, der Franz Beckenbauer war"
 2017: Deutscher Comedypreis - Best Actor for "Selbstgespraeche mit Konstantin Pfau", "Der Meisterreporter - Sigmar Seelenbrecht wird 81"
 2018: Deutscher Comedypreis / Category „Best Sitcom“ Jennifer – Sehnsucht nach was Besseres (Ensemblemember)
 2019: Prix Pantheon, Honorary Award

Music 
 1995: Echo for "Die Doofen“
 1995: Viva COMET for "Die Doofen“
 1995: Goldene Stimmgabel (ZDF) for "Die Doofen“
 1996: Golden Reel Award (United States) for "Die Doofen“
 1995–1996: 7 Gold and Platin Awards for "Die Doofen“
 2005–2006: 5 Country Music-Awards (diverse Kategorien) for "Texas Lightning“
 2006: 3 Gold and Platin Awards for "Texas Lightning“

Honors 
Asteroid 283141 Dittsche, discovered by German amateur astronomer Rolf Apitzsch in 2008, was named in his honor. The official  was published by the Minor Planet Center on 6 April 2018.

References

External links 

 
 Olli Dittrich-musik.de

German male television actors
German male comedians
German male musicians
German television personalities
20th-century German male actors
21st-century German male actors
Living people
1956 births
Eurovision Song Contest entrants of 2006
Eurovision Song Contest entrants for Germany